Westmere (formerly Nehalem-C) is the code name given to the 32 nm die shrink of Nehalem. While sharing the same CPU sockets, Westmere included Intel HD Graphics, while Nehalem did not.

The first Westmere-based processors were launched on January 7, 2010, by Intel Corporation.

The Westmere architecture has been available under the Intel brands of Core i3, Core i5, Core i7, Pentium, Celeron and Xeon.

Technology 
Westmere's feature improvements from Nehalem, as reported:

 Native six-core (Gulftown) and ten-core (Westmere-EX) processors.
 A new set of instructions that gives over 3x the encryption and decryption rate of Advanced Encryption Standard (AES) processes compared to before.
 Delivers seven new instructions (AES instruction set or AES-NI), out of which six implement the AES algorithm, and PCLMULQDQ (see CLMUL instruction set) implements carry-less multiplication for use in cryptography and data compression.
 Integrated graphics, added into the processor package (dual core Arrandale and Clarkdale only).
 Improved virtualization latency.
 New virtualization capability: "VMX Unrestricted mode support," which allows 16-bit guests to run (real mode and big real mode).
 Support for "Huge Pages" of 1 GB in size.

CPU variants

Westmere CPUs

 TDP includes the integrated GPU, if present.
 Clarkdale processors feature 16 PCIe 2.0 lanes, which can be used in 1x16 or 2x8 configuration.
 Clarkdale and Arrandale contain the 32 nm dual core processor Hillel and the 45 nm integrated graphics device Ironlake, and support switchable graphics.
 Only certain higher-end CPUs support AES-NI and 1GB Huge Pages.

Server / Desktop processors

Mobile processors

Roadmap
The successor to Nehalem and Westmere is Sandy Bridge.

See also
 List of Intel CPU microarchitectures
 Tick-Tock model

References

External links
 Official Intel homepage for Westmere-EP
 Official Intel homepage for Westmere-EX
 Westmere-EX: A 20 thread server CPU (PDF)

Intel microarchitectures
X86 microarchitectures